Shantaram Rajeshwar Potdukhe (30 January 1933 – 23 September 2018) was an Indian politician and a Member of Parliament of India.  Potdukhe was member of Lok Sabhas for four straight terms; 7th, 8th, 9th and 10th Lok Sabhas of India. He represented the Chandrapur constituency of Maharashtra and was a member of the Indian National Congress political party.

Early life and education
Shantaram Potdukhe was born in Chandrapur, in the state of Maharashtra. He held BA and BJ degrees from Hislop College & Nagpur University respectively. After completing his education, Potdukhe worked as a journalist.

Political career
Shantaram Potdukhe joined Congress (I) and contested elections in 1980. He defeated Raje Vishveshvar Rao who was a member of the 6th Lok Sabha. Potdukhe was re-elected to three subsequent terms from the same constituency and party. During his term as Member of Parliament, Potdukhe held position of Union Minister of State and was also member of several committees.

Posts held

See also

7th, 8th, 9th & 10th Lok Sabha
Lok Sabha
Politics of India
Parliament of India
Government of India
Indian National Congress
Chandrapur

References 

India MPs 1980–1984
India MPs 1984–1989
India MPs 1989–1991
India MPs 1991–1996
Indian National Congress politicians
Lok Sabha members from Maharashtra
Marathi politicians
People from Chandrapur
People from Chandrapur district
1933 births
2018 deaths